The 1962–63 Washington Huskies men's basketball team represented the University of Washington for the 1962–63 NCAA University Division basketball season. Led by fourth-year head coach John Grayson, the Huskies were members of the Athletic Association of Western Universities (Big Five) and played their home games on campus at Hec Edmundson Pavilion in Seattle, Washington.

Grayson was relieved of his duties on April 13 by athletic director Jim Owens, and assistant Mac Duckworth was promoted to head coach ten days later.

References

External links
Sports Reference – Washington Huskies: 1962–63 basketball season

Washington Huskies men's basketball seasons
Washington Huskies
Washington
Washington